The California Hotel is a historic Oakland, California, hotel which opened in the early days of the Great Depression and became an important cultural center for the African-American community of San Francisco's East Bay during the 1940s, 50s and 60s. On June 30, 1988 the hotel was placed on the National Register of Historic Places.

History 
The California Hotel opened its doors on May 18, 1930.  A 5-story structure with mezzanine and penthouse, it was the tallest building in the area.  It cost $265,000 to build the 150-room hotel with commercial space on the ground floor.  Though situated 1 miles from Oakland's city center, the new hotel was within walking distance of the passenger stations for both the Santa Fe Railroad and the regional Key System streetcars.

The hotel was located at 3501 San Pablo Avenue, near major highways, and passing traffic was increased in 1937 by the opening of the San Francisco–Oakland Bay Bridge. In 1962 construction of the elevated MacArthur Freeway blocked the street view of the hotel but made it visible to hundreds of thousands of bridge commuters.

The hotel opened in difficult economic times.  The hotel's first manager, Axel Bern, an experienced hotelier, was also an investor.  Just four months after the grand opening, Bern was arrested and charged with disturbing the peace after a quarrel in the hotel's lobby.  According to a story in the Oakland Tribune, Bern had reneged on his commitment to invest $35,000 into the hotel and had been relieved of his duties as general manager.  However, Bern returned to work at the front desk on the day of his arrest.

To attract the car driving public, the hotel's owners added a "motorists patio" in 1933, with a separate entrance from the parking area directly to the lobby.  Next to the patio was a garage building, a service station and a repair shop.  An advertisement in the 1943 Oakland City Directory described the hotel amenities as "commodious airy rooms, all with shower and tub baths, dining, banquet and meeting rooms, coffee shop and cocktail lounges, garage adjoining".

During World War II, the hotel was known for the blues, jazz and similar 'race music' being played in its ground floor bars and ballrooms. African American patrons were denied rooms due to segregation, but they came in large numbers to hear the music.   On January 16, 1953, new ownership took control, and the hotel ended its discrimination policies.  A grand "reopening" was held with invited guests that included Oakland-born comedian Eddie "Rochester" Anderson, boxing champion Joe Louis and acclaimed singer Lena Horne.  The hotel attracted many high profile black visitors to Oakland.  At that time, it was the only full-service hotel that welcomed black people in the East Bay.  The 1956 edition of The Negro Motorist Green Book also lists five smaller, less sophisticated Oakland hotels.

African American entertainers who lodged and performed at the hotel included Big Mama Thornton, BB King, Lou Rawls, James Brown, Sam Cooke, Ray Charles and Richard Pryor.

After the 1960s, the hotel, as with many dedicated African American institutions and businesses in the area, declined; black entertainers could now stay in any hotel, and patrons followed them to white-owned clubs and other venues.

By the 1970s, the hotel was in bad condition and was boarded up.  In the 1980s, it was repaired and rented out as subsidized housing.

In 2012, a start was made on restoring the building and in 2014, after a renovation costing $43 million, it was once more opened as low-rental housing.

References 

Historic hotels in the United States
Hotels in the San Francisco Bay Area
Buildings and structures in Oakland, California
Music venues in the San Francisco Bay Area
Residential buildings in Alameda County, California
1930 establishments in California
Hotels established in 1930
Hotel buildings completed in 1930
African-American history in Oakland, California
African-American segregation in the United States